Drechslera is a genus of fungi. Many of the species in this genus are plant pathogens.

Species 
The following species are accepted within Drechslera:
Drechslera andersenii A.Lam
Drechslera apii (Göbelez) M.J.Richardson & E.M.Fraser
Drechslera arizonica (R.Sprague) Subram. & B.L.Jain
Drechslera avenacea (M.A.Curtis ex Cooke) Shoemaker
Drechslera avenicola B.D.Sun & T.Y.Zhang
Drechslera boeremae A.S.Patil & V.G.Rao
Drechslera campanulata (Lév.) B.Sutton
Drechslera chattopadhyayi N.C.Mandal & M.K.Dasgupta
Drechslera cymmartinii A.P.Misra & R.A.Singh
Drechslera dematioidea 
Drechslera elliptica H.F.Wang & T.Y.Zhang, 2017
Drechslera ellisii Danquah
Drechslera eragrostidis (Henn.) Subram. & B.L.Jain
Drechslera euphorbiae (Hansf.) M.B.Ellis
Drechslera festucae Scharif
Drechslera fici T.P.Mall & Aj.Kumar, 2013
Drechslera flavispora Ondřej
Drechslera frauensteinii M.Sass
Drechslera gigantea (Heald & F.A.Wolf) S.Ito
Drechslera glycines 
Drechslera graminea (Schltdl. ex Rabenh.) Shoemaker, 1962
Drechslera hawaiiensis
Drechslera helianthi Hulea
Drechslera holci Ondřej
Drechslera hongkongensis J.M.Yen
Drechslera linicola (Kletsh.) Ondřej
Drechslera litseae Gadp., C.D.Sharma, Firdousi, A.N.Rai & K.M.Vyas
Drechslera mediocris (V.A.Putterill) Subram. & B.L.Jain
Drechslera musae-sapientium (Hansf.) M.B.Ellis
Drechslera ocella (Faris) Subram. & B.L.Jain
Drechslera pallida Porta-Puglia & Del Serrone
Drechslera patereae M.R.Carranza
Dreschlera poae (Baudy) Shoemaker
Drechslera salviniae J.J.Muchovej
Drechslera sesami (J.Miyake) M.J.Richardson & E.M.Fraser
Drechslera siliculosa (P.Crouan & H.Crouan) Subram. & B.L.Jain
Drechslera sivanesanii Manohar. & V.R.T.Reddy
Drechslera teres 
Drechslera teres f. maculata 
Drechslera triseti Ondřej
Drechslera triticicola C.K.Pai, J.C.Zhang & X.T.Zhu
Drechslera wirreganensis Wallwork, Lichon & Sivan.
Drechslera yamadae (Y.Nisik.) Subram. & B.L.Jain
Drechslera zizaniae (Y.Nisik.) Subram. & B.L.Jain

References

Pleosporaceae
Dothideomycetes genera
Taxa described in 1930